HM Prison Send is a closed category women's prison in the extreme south of Ripley nearer Send in Surrey, England.  Its post town is Woking.  The prison is operated by His Majesty's Prison Service.

History
A smallpox isolation hospital on its site became a prison in 1962 when it opened as a Junior Detention Centre. It remained as such until 1987 when it was re-classified as a Category C Adult Male Training Prison. Send was demolished and completely rebuilt by 1999, opening as a closed Female Training Prison.

In August 2005, a report by the Independent Monitoring Board criticised a marked increase in self-harm and suicide amongst inmates and lack of staff, whereas it praised the prison's education provision and its farms and gardens scheme.

The prison today
Send is a closed prison for adult females. It houses an 80-bed Resettlement Unit, a 40-bed Therapeutic Community, a 20-bed Progression PIPE and a 20-bed Preparation PIPE.

HMP Send's Education Department runs Key Skills courses and NVQs in Business Administration. The Farms and Gardens department offers Floristry NVQs, and the Works Department run an industrial workshop and painting party. Prisoners held in the Resettlement Unit can also do voluntary work, attend College courses and Work Placements in the outside community.

Notable inmates

Former
 Jane Andrews
 Vanessa George
Mairead Philpott
Dena Thompson

References

External links

Prisons in Surrey
Send
1962 establishments in England